

The Farman F.180 Oiseau Bleu (en: Bluebird) was a 1920s French biplane airliner. The F.180 was designed to fly non-stop between Paris and New York, but when the crossing attempt was cancelled three aircraft were built as luxury transports to operate from Paris to nearby European capital cities for the company's own airline.

Development

The F.180 had an advanced (for the 1920s) oval-section fuselage with unequal-span, two-bay wings. It had an enclosed cockpit for two crew and a luxury main cabin for 24 passengers. The aircraft was powered by two Farman piston engines mounted in push-pull configuration in tandem beneath the upper wing centre section, which was supported above the fuselage on two pairs of struts. One design flaw was the landing gear which had a very narrow track main gear wheels which for a heavy aircraft produced a rough ride on grass airfields.

The F.180 flew for the first time in November 1927. The first aircraft was delivered in 1928 followed shortly by two others which all remained in service for a number of years.

Operators

Farman Line

Specifications (F.180)

References

Notes

Bibliography

1920s French airliners
F.0180
Biplanes
Twin-engined push-pull aircraft